Gronkowski is a Thoroughbred racehorse (born in 2015) who came second in the 2018 Belmont Stakes and 2019 Dubai World Cup. He is named after American football tight end Rob Gronkowski, who is a minority owner of the horse.

Racing career
Gronkowski raced several times in the United Kingdom, and won the Burradon Stakes. He was then going to race in the 2018 Kentucky Derby, but pulled out due to a fever. He went to the 2018 Belmont Stakes instead where he finished second in the race with odds of 24.75 to 1. 

As a four-year-old, Gronkowski came second in the 2019 Dubai World Cup, losing to Thunder Snow by a nose.

References

2015 racehorse births
Racehorses trained in the United Kingdom
Racehorses trained in the United States
Racehorses bred in the United States
Thoroughbred family 9-f